This is a list of crime films released in 2007.

References

2000s
2007-related lists